Thong Saw Pak (born 20 July 1924) was a Singaporean weightlifter. He competed in the men's lightweight event at the 1952 Summer Olympics.

References

External links
 

1924 births
Living people
Singaporean male weightlifters
Olympic weightlifters of Singapore
Weightlifters at the 1952 Summer Olympics
Place of birth missing (living people)
Commonwealth Games medallists in weightlifting
Commonwealth Games silver medallists for Malaysia
Weightlifters at the 1950 British Empire Games
20th-century Singaporean people
Medallists at the 1950 British Empire Games